The Baqa'a refugee camp, first created in 1968, lies 20 km north of the Jordanian capital Amman, and is home to around 100,000 Palestinian refugees who are registered as such with the United Nations. It is the largest refugee camp in Jordan, followed by the Zaatari refugee camp.

History
Baqa'a was one of six "emergency" camps set up in Jordan in 1968 to house Palestinians who left the West Bank and Gaza Strip during the 1967 Arab–Israeli war. Between June 1967 and February 1968, residents were housed in temporary camps in the Jordan valley. When Baqa'a was set up it had 5,000 tents for 26,000 refugees on an area of about 1.4 square kilometres. UNRWA replaced the tents with 8,048 prefabricated shelters between 1969 and 1971 with contributions from West Germany. Most of the residents have since then replaced the original tents and prefabs with concrete shelters.

Facilities
During the 2003–04 school term, the 16 schools in the camp enrolled 16,718 students, and had 493 paid employees on the teaching staff, with each school run on a double-shift basis in eight school buildings. The UN also runs a general clinic, and two mother-and-child clinics, which jointly treat around 1,200 patients every day, and which are staffed by 12 doctors, two dentists, and 57 nurses and assistants; there is also a kindergarten and nursery financed by UNRWA. Two women's programs run courses in sewing, hairdressing, computers, Internet, exercise, English, legal consultancy, and handicrafts. There are also two sports clubs and 17 charities operating in the camp.

The camp houses a market, called Souq Al-Hal-lal, where residents can earn some money selling their wares or food, and many also earn a living by traveling by bus in the morning to Amman, where they work as cleaning or maintenance staff.

References

Populated places established in 1968
Palestinian refugee camps in Jordan